Filip Filipović may refer to:
Filip Filipović (politician) (1878–1938), Serbian League of Communists of Yugoslavia politician
Filip Filipović (American football) (born 1977), American football player of Serbian descent
Filip Filipović (water polo) (born 1987), Serbian water polo player